Falkensee is a railway station in the town of Falkensee, Brandenburg, Germany. The station lies on the Berlin–Hamburg railway and the train services are operated by Deutsche Bahn and Ostdeutsche Eisenbahn.

Train services
The station is served by the following services:

Regional services  Wismar - Schwerin - Ludwigslust - Wittenberge - Berlin - Cottbus
Regional services  Wittenberge – Pritzwalk – Wittstock – Neuruppin – Henningsorf – Berlin
Local services  Nauen – Falkensee – Berlin
Local services  Nauen – Falkensee – Berlin – Flughafen BER

References

External links

Railway stations in Brandenburg
Buildings and structures in Havelland (district)
Railway stations in Germany opened in 1848
Berlin S-Bahn stations